The Women's 53 kg event at the 2013 Southeast Asian Games took place on 14 December 2013 at Thein Phyu Stadium.

Schedule
All times are Myanmar Standard Time (UTC+06:30)

Results

References

External links
27th Sea Games - 27th SEA Games - Myanmar 2013

Weightlifting at the 2013 Southeast Asian Games